U.S. Route 222 (US 222) is a U.S. Highway that is a spur of US 22 in the states of Maryland and Pennsylvania. US 222 is almost entirely in Pennsylvania, and serves as the state's principal artery between the Lancaster and Reading areas and the Lehigh Valley. 

US 222 heads north from US 1 in Conowingo and soon crosses from Maryland into Pennsylvania, continuing north through rural areas and passing through Quarryville and Willow Street before reaching Lancaster. The route passes through Lancaster on a one-way pair of city streets before becoming a freeway at US 30 north of the city. The US 222 freeway heads northeast, crossing US 322 in Ephrata and coming to an interchange with the Pennsylvania Turnpike (I-76). US 222 bypasses Reading to the west, where it forms a concurrency with US 422. The freeway section ends past Reading and the route continues northeast through rural areas, with a freeway bypass of Kutztown. US 222 bypasses Trexlertown on a multilane divided expressway before coming to its northern terminus at I-78/PA 309 in Dorneyville, where the road continues into Allentown as PA 222.

Route description

Conowingo to Lancaster

US 222 begins at an intersection with US 1 in the community of Conowingo in Cecil County, Maryland. Following US 1 southwest to the Conowingo Dam across the Susquehanna River leads to the northern terminus of MD 222. From this intersection, the route heads northwest on two-lane undivided Rock Springs Road, passing through a mix of fields and woods with some homes. The road curves to the north through woodland and passes east of the community of Oakwood. US 222 turns to the northeast and runs through fields and woods with some development, passing to the southeast of the Rock Springs Generation Facility in the community of Rock Springs before it comes to the Mason–Dixon line, which marks the border between the states of Maryland and Pennsylvania.

Upon crossing the Mason–Dixon line, US 222 enters Fulton Township in Lancaster County, Pennsylvania, and heads north as Robert Fulton Highway, passing between woodland to the west and farm fields to the east. The route turns to the north-northwest and runs through agricultural areas with some trees and homes, passing through the community of New Texas Lyles. The road continues through rural areas and curves to the north, heading into the residential community of Wakefield and coming to an intersection with PA 272. At this point, PA 272 turns north for a concurrency with US 222 along Robert Fulton Highway, running through a mix of farms and homes. PA 272 splits from US 222 in the community of Penn Hill by heading northwest, and US 222 continues northeast through wooded areas. The road heads into a mix of fields and woods and reaches the community of Goshen, where it turns to the north. The route runs through farmland with some woods and homes, curving northeast before heading back to the north and passing to the east of the Robert Fulton Birthplace. US 222 continues north-northeast through rural land and passes through the community of Bethel, where it crosses into Little Britain Township. The road heads north and enters East Drumore Township, continuing through farmland with some trees and residences and passing through the communities of Unicorn and Mechanics Grove. The route passes east of Solanco High School and bends to the north-northwest as it runs through more rural land.

US 222 enters the borough of Quarryville and becomes South Church Street, heading north past homes. The route comes to an intersection with PA 372, at which point it turns west-southwest to join that route on West State Street, running through more residential areas. US 222 splits from PA 372 by heading northwest onto West 4th Street, passing between businesses to the southwest and homes to the northeast before running through more residential areas, cutting through a corner of East Drumore Township before heading into Providence Township. At this point, the route enters the Pennsylvania Dutch Country of eastern Lancaster County, which is home to many Amish farms. In Providence Township, the route becomes Beaver Valley Pike and passes under the Enola Low Grade Trail before it runs through a mix of farmland, woodland, and residential and commercial development. The road crosses the Big Beaver Creek into Strasburg Township and heads northwest through more rural land with some development, with the creek parallel to the southwest. The creek bends away to the west and US 222 continues into agricultural areas with occasional homes, passing through the community of Martinsville and turning to the west-northwest. The route passes to the northeast of the community of Refton and curves northwest, crossing the Pequea Creek into West Lampeter Township. The road heads north through farmland and bends northwest to reach an intersection with PA 741. Here, PA 741 becomes concurrent with US 222 and the two routes curve to the west-southwest, passing between farm fields to the north and residential and commercial development to the south and heading into the community of Willow Street. Here, the road comes to an intersection with PA 272, which is split into a one-way pair at this point.

At this point, US 222 splits from PA 741 by turning north to join PA 272 along Willow Street Pike, a one-way pair which carries two lanes in each direction. PA 272 becomes unsigned along the US 222 concurrency. Both directions of Willow Street Pike rejoin and it continues north as a two-lane undivided road past commercial development before it runs through wooded residential areas, passing through Hollinger. US 222/PA 272 crosses Mill Creek and heads through the community of Lyndon. The road briefly gains a center left-turn lane as it continues through wooded areas of development and passes to the west of a golf course. US 222/PA 272 splits into a one-way pair, with two lanes in each direction, and crosses the Conestoga River into Lancaster Township.

Lancaster to Reading

After crossing the Conestoga River, northbound US 222/PA 272 becomes Highland Avenue and southbound US 222/PA 272 is called South Prince Street. The southbound direction intersects PA 324 in the community of Engleside before the two routes continue into the city of Lancaster, heading into urban residential and commercial areas. A short distance after entering Lancaster, northbound US 222/PA 272 intersects the end of one-way northbound PA 324 and heads onto South Queen Street. The two routes continues past urban rowhomes along South Queen Street northbound and South Prince Street southbound, with South Queen Street passing to the west of Woodward Hill Cemetery. Northbound US 222/PA 272 splits from South Queen Street by heading northeast onto Church Street, which carries three lanes of one-way traffic, while northbound PA 72 starts along South Queen Street. Just south of downtown Lancaster, the northbound direction of the route turns north onto South Lime Street, which carries two lanes of one-way traffic. US 222/PA 272 heads into the commercial downtown of Lancaster and crosses eastbound PA 462 at King Street. Past this, the route becomes North Lime Street northbound and North Prince Street southbound, crossing eastbound PA 23 at Chestnut Street and westbound PA 23/PA 462 at Walnut Street. The two routes leave the downtown area and run through urban areas of homes and businesses. The northbound direction passes to the east of Lancaster General Hospital between East James and East Frederick streets while the southbound direction passes to the east of Clipper Magazine Stadium, home of the Lancaster Barnstormers baseball team, north of the Harrisburg Avenue/West James Street intersection. At the intersection with Liberty Street, northbound US 222/PA 272 shifts west a block onto four-lane undivided North Duke Street, a two-way road, while the one-way pair continues into Manheim Township. A block later, at McGovern Avenue, both directions of US 222/PA 272 rejoin along North Duke Street. Southbound US 222/PA 272 follows McGovern Avenue west between North Duke Street and North Prince Street, forming the border between a portion of the city of Lancaster that is home to the Lancaster station along Amtrak's Keystone Corridor railroad line to the north and Manheim Township to the south. The roadway is a three-lane road with two westbound lanes that carry southbound US 222/PA 272 and one eastbound lane. McGovern Avenue reaches an intersection with northbound PA 72 at North Queen Street, where northbound PA 72 turns west to join southbound US 222/PA 272 along the road. At North Prince Street, southbound US 222/PA 272 turn south while PA 72 becomes two-way heading north.

Both directions of US 222/PA 272 continue north along four-lane undivided North Duke Street and the road reaches the Thaddeus Stevens Bridge over Amtrak's Keystone Corridor, where it becomes the border between Manheim Township to the west and Lancaster to the east. At Keller Avenue, the road name changes to Lititz Pike and it fully enters Manheim Township, running through commercial areas as a five-lane road with a center left-turn lane. Northbound US 222 and PA 272 head northeast onto Oregon Pike, with PA 272 becoming signed again, while southbound US 222 and PA 501 continue north along Lititz Pike. The two routes continue northeast as a three-lane road with a center left-turn lane and runs past businesses and a few homes before it comes to an interchange with the US 30 freeway. Here, US 222 splits from PA 272, which becomes signed again, by heading east concurrent with US 30 on an eight-lane freeway, passing near developed areas. US 222 splits from US 30 at a trumpet interchange and heads north onto a four-lane freeway. The route curves northeast and runs through a mix of farmland and residential and commercial development. The freeway comes to a northbound exit and entrance with Butter Road, which provides access to PA 272 via Jake Landis Road, and a southbound exit and entrance with PA 272. Past this interchange, US 222 continues through a mix of farm fields and woodland, passing through a corner of Warwick Township before crossing the Cocalico Creek into West Earl Township.

The route passes near farmland before heading near homes and businesses, reaching a partial cloverleaf interchange with PA 772 north of the community of Brownstown. Past here, the freeway runs northeast through agricultural areas. Farther along, US 222 curves to the north and comes to a diverging diamond interchange with US 322 southeast of the borough of Ephrata, at which point it crosses into Ephrata Township. The route passes near businesses at the interchange before it turns northeast and runs through wooded areas with some nearby residential development and farm fields. The freeway heads into East Cocalico Township and runs through more woodland before it passes to the southeast of the community of Reamstown. US 222 passes through farmland and comes to a diamond interchange with Colonel Howard Boulevard, which heads west to provide access to PA 272 and east to provide access to the Pennsylvania Turnpike (I-76). Following this, the route passes over the Pennsylvania Turnpike and crosses into Brecknock Township, running through a mix of farm fields and woods with some nearby residential and commercial development as it passes to the southeast of the borough of Adamstown.

The US 222 freeway enters Brecknock Township in Berks County and continues north, passing a northbound weigh station before coming to a partial cloverleaf interchange serving the northern terminus of PA 272 and the western terminus of PA 568. Past this interchange, the route crosses into Spring Township and runs through wooded areas with some fields and homes, curving to the northeast and reaching a diamond interchange at Mohns Hill Road to the west of the community of Gouglersville. Here, the freeway crosses into Cumru Township and runs north-northeast through more rural areas, coming to a diamond interchange that connects to Grings Hill Road west of the borough of Mohnton.

Reading to Allentown

A short distance later, US 222 comes to a northbound exit and southbound entrance with the southern terminus of US 222 Bus., a business route that passes through the city of Reading, which US 222 bypasses to the west. From here, the route curves to the north and crosses back into Spring Township, passing near suburban residential development and coming to a partial cloverleaf interchange with PA 724 in a business area. The freeway turns to the northeast and passes through residential areas and some woodland between the community of West Wyomissing to the north and Lincoln Park to the south. US 222 briefly forms the border between Spring Township to the north and the borough of Wyomissing to the south before it bends to the north-northeast into Spring Township. The route crosses into Wyomissing and comes to an interchange with US 422 and the western terminus of US 422 Bus., at which point it also passes over Norfolk Southern's Harrisburg Line. At this interchange, US 422 becomes concurrent with US 222, and the two routes continue east-northeast along the six-lane Warren Street Bypass freeway, running between residential areas to the northwest and the Norfolk Southern tracks to the southeast.  The freeway curves north into business areas and comes to a partial cloverleaf interchange with State Hill Road. Following this, US 222/US 422 passes between the Berkshire Mall to the west and commercial areas to the east before it reaches an interchange with Paper Mill Road and Crossing Drive, where it curves to the northeast and runs near more businesses. The freeway comes to an interchange where US 222 splits to the northwest, US 422 immediately afterward splits southeast along the West Shore Bypass, and, straight ahead, PA 12 begins northeast along the Warren Street Bypass.

Past this interchange, US 222 heads northwest as a four-lane freeway, crossing back into Spring Township and running between a farm field to the southwest and the Penn State Berks university campus to the northeast before reaching a diamond interchange with Broadcasting Road. The route between US 422 and the northern end of this expressway portion is known as the Outer Bypass, the POW/MIA Memorial Highway by an act of the Pennsylvania General Assembly, or the "Road to Nowhere" as it was known while incomplete and to this day.  The route runs between a shopping center to the southwest and Tulpehocken Valley County Park to the northeast prior to reaching the Spring Ridge Drive exit. At this point, the freeway turns north and crosses the Tulpehocken Creek into Bern Township and runs north-northeast through wooded areas with some nearby homes and commercial development, coming to a partial cloverleaf interchange with PA 183. Following this, US 222 curves northeast, passing to the northwest of Reading Regional Airport and running through farm fields before crossing the Schuylkill River into Muhlenberg Township. The route passes near residential neighborhoods and some commercial development, passing over the Reading Blue Mountain and Northern Railroad's Reading Division line and reaching a partial cloverleaf interchange with PA 61. The freeway passes under another Reading Blue Mountain and Northern Railroad line and Norfolk Southern's Evansville Industrial Track railroad line, crossing into Ontelaunee Township. At this point, US 222 heads northeast through industrial areas, with Norfolk Southern's Reading Line parallel to the southeast. The freeway comes to an end at a trumpet interchange, where US 222 intersects the northern terminus of US 222 Bus. and merges onto that road.

From here, US 222 heads north-northeast on four-lane divided Allentown Pike past a few businesses. The route enters Maidencreek Township and becomes a five-lane road with a center left-turn lane, running through a mix of fields and woods with some homes. The road curves northeast and passes commercial development, coming to an intersection with PA 73 in the community of Maiden Creek. Past this intersection, US 222 runs past a mix of residential development and businesses with some farm fields, meeting Tamarack Boulevard/Genesis Drive and Schaeffer Road at roundabouts. At this point, the route narrows to three lanes with a center left-turn lane and heads into the agricultural East Penn Valley in northeastern Berks County, which is home to an Old Order Mennonite community. US 222 continues northeast through farmland with some trees, residences, and businesses, passing through the community of Kirbyville and crossing into Richmond Township, where the name becomes Kutztown Road. Farther northeast, the road heads past businesses and comes to a roundabout with PA 662 in the community of Moselem Springs. US 222 continues through farmland with some development, passing to the southeast of a golf course in the community of Kempville.

The route becomes a four-lane freeway called the Kutztown Bypass, which bypasses the borough of Kutztown to the northwest, with a northbound exit and southbound entrance at Kutztown Road providing access to Kutztown. The freeway heads northeast through agricultural areas and crosses into Maxatawny Township, where it comes to a southbound exit and northbound entrance at Crystal Cave Road that provides access to Crystal Cave and the community of Virginville. From here, the route heads through more rural land before it passes through a section of Kutztown and runs near residential areas and farmland north of the Kutztown University of Pennsylvania campus. US 222 crosses back into Maxatawny Township and curves east, passing over the Sacony Creek and coming to a partial cloverleaf interchange with the southern terminus of PA 737 that provides access to Kutztown. The freeway crosses back into Kutztown and passes near homes before it reenters Maxatawny Township and the Kutztown Bypass ends at a southbound exit and northbound entrance with Kutztown Road that serves the borough. From here, US 222 becomes two-lane undivided Kutztown Road and runs east-northeast through farmland before heading past businesses near the Long Lane intersection. The route gains a center left-turn lane and passes through the residential community of Monterey before it continues through agricultural areas. Farther east, the road heads into the community of Maxatawny, where it is lined with homes and a few businesses.

US 222 enters Upper Macungie Township in Lehigh County, which is in the Lehigh Valley, and becomes two-lane undivided Hamilton Boulevard, passing through farmland with some businesses and coming to a roundabout with the southern terminus of PA 863, Schantz Road, and Farmington Road. The route gains a center left-turn lane and continues east through farm fields with some homes and businesses, heading to the south of an office park. Residential and commercial development along the road increases as it passes to the north of the community of Breinigsville. A bit further east, US 222 diverges from Hamilton Boulevard at a northbound exit and southbound entrance onto a four-lane divided expressway called the Frederick J. Jaindl Jr. Memorial Highway, immediately reaching a partial interchange with the PA 100 bypass of the community of Trexlertown. Here, Hamilton Boulevard continues east into Trexlertown, northbound US 222 merges with northbound PA 100, and southbound US 222 splits from southbound PA 100. All other connections between PA 100 and US 222 are provided by Hamilton Boulevard and Weilers Road. US 222 and PA 100 continue north concurrent along the expressway, passing near homes and intersecting Grim Road/Cetronia Road at-grade. The road curves northeast and runs between warehouses to the northwest and housing developments to the southeast. PA 100 splits from US 222 at a diamond interchange, at which point PA 100 continues north and Trexlertown Road heads south. US 222 continues past industrial areas and farmland, coming to a bridge over Norfolk Southern's C&F Secondary. The route bends east and runs past more farmland before heading near residential neighborhoods, crossing over Cetronia Road on a bridge before intersecting Grange Road/Mill Creek Road at-grade. US 222 crosses into Lower Macungie Township and curves to the east-northeast, passing north of a shopping center and intersecting North Krocks Road at an at-grade intersection with a northbound exit and entrance ramp for right turns and access to and from the shopping center. Past this, the route has a southbound exit to Brookside Road north of the community of Wescosville. The road comes to a bridge over the Pennsylvania Turnpike Northeast Extension (I-476) and runs between industrial development to the north and businesses to the south, reaching an intersection with Hamilton Boulevard and Cedarbrook Road/Kressler Road. Here, US 222 widens to six lanes and becomes Hamilton Boulevard again, heading east-northeast to the north of a park and ride lot before it comes to its northern terminus at a partial cloverleaf interchange with I-78/PA 309 in the community of Dorneyville. Past this interchange, Hamilton Boulevard continues as PA 222 towards the city of Allentown.

History

When US 222 was first designated in the 1920s, it only reached as far north as Reading, but at the time US 22 dipped down from Allentown to Reading, then west to Harrisburg. US 22 was rerouted to become a straight shot from Allentown to Harrisburg so the roadway between Reading and Allentown became part of US 222, explaining why the highway, designated as north/south, actually runs mostly east/west between the two cities.

By the early 1930s the road then signed as US 22 became problematic for motorists in Lebanon along the current US 422; Reading via US 22 and US 222; and Allentown on Hamilton Street (US 22). PA 43 had been aligned as a bypass between Allentown and Harrisburg. On June 8, 1931, the American Association of State Highway Officials came to a resolution to the traffic problem, by replacing the PA 43 corridor with US 22 and the William Penn Highway name to match. The state truncated PA 43 to Susquehanna Street from Allentown to Bethlehem.  US 222 replaced the former US 22 alignment from Reading to Allentown. Hamilton Street was numbered as US 222, west of Center City Allentown, where it turned north onto 15th Street.  This portion of US 222 was seven-blocks long which ended at Tilghman Street (then US 22).  Signs were changed to reflect the new designations on May 31, 1932, with the new route designations officially in place on June 1, 1932.

The first stretch of highway between Perryville and Conowingo in Maryland that would become part of US 222 to be improved was in Perryville, where Cecil County constructed with state aid a macadam road from the Aikin station on the Baltimore and Ohio Railroad south toward the Post Road (now MD 7) by 1910. Cecil County extended the macadam road to the Post Road by 1919. The highway from the Aikin railroad crossing to Port Deposit was paved as a  concrete road in two sections: from the railroad to near Port Deposit by 1921 and through Port Deposit by 1923. MD 268, which was the original designation for the road between Perryville and Conowingo, was paved as a concrete road from Port Deposit to US 1 at Conowingo Dam between 1930 and 1933; the construction work included repurposing a railroad bridge across Octoraro Creek as a highway bridge. MD 268's bridge across the Baltimore and Ohio Railroad was constructed between 1931 and 1934. The old highway approaching the Aikin grade crossing became MD 449.

The section of Rock Springs Road between present-day US 1 and Old Conowingo Road/Ragan Road was constructed by the state of Maryland as a macadam road by 1921. The portion of Rock Springs Road between Old Conowingo Road/Ragan Road and the Pennsylvania border was built by the state as a concrete road by 1928. US 222 was designated in Maryland by 1930, with the southern terminus at US 1 in Conowingo.

MD 268 was replaced by a southern extension of US 222 from US 1 at Conowingo to US 40 (now MD 7) in Perryville in 1938. The portion of US 222 from US 40 to near Port Deposit was expanded to improve access between the U.S. Highway and United States Naval Training Center Bainbridge, east of Port Deposit in 1942 and 1944.

With the construction of the Lehigh Valley Thruway in the early 1950s and the relocation of US 22 to that route, US 222 was extended east along Tilghman Street to 7th Street, then north on 7th Street to the interchange with the new freeway.

In the late 1950s, US 222 was realigned to a newly constructed bypass carrying US 309 and PA 29, west of Allentown.  From the south, US 222 left Hamilton Boulevard and turned north onto the freeway.  US 222 terminated at an interchange with US 22, US 309, and PA 29 in South Whitehall Township. The freeway, originally signed as US 309/PA 29/US 222, dropped the PA 29 designation in 1966; in 1968, US 309 was replaced with to PA 309 and US 222 was truncated to end at the current northern termini. By the 1980s, I-78 became part of the freeway that occupied PA 309.

US 222 in Maryland was widened and resurfaced between what is now the MD 222–MD 275—MD 824 intersection and Port Deposit in 1959 and 1960. US 222 was relocated as part of the construction of its original diamond interchange with I-95 in 1962 and 1963. The old alignment of US 222 east of its I-95 interchange became MD 824. The highway was resurfaced with bituminous concrete from MD 7 to US 40 and reconstructed and widened from US 40 to the southern MD 824 intersection in 1968 and 1969. The widening work included widening US 222's bridge across the Baltimore and Ohio Railroad, which was removed and replaced between 1987 and 1989. The I-95 interchange was converted from a standard diamond to a four-ramp partial cloverleaf with all four ramps east of US 222 between 1993 and 1994.

With increased development in the late 20th century the two-lane road became increasingly congested. To alleviate these problems a number of construction projects took place, most notably a four-lane Reading bypass, a four-lane expressway to connect Lancaster to Reading, and a four-lane expressway bypass around the borough of Kutztown, which is situated between Reading and Allentown.

Studies for a limited-access highway connecting Lancaster and Reading began in the early 1950s. In 1962, construction began on a four-lane highway between Spring Township and Bern Township that would eventually connect to US 222. After construction stopped, this stretch became known as "The Road to Nowhere." In 1970, construction began for a freeway bypass carrying US 222 around Kutztown. The US 222 bypass of Kutztown opened on May 25, 1973, with a ribbon-cutting ceremony held. In 1973, the federal government approved the relocation of homes and businesses along the path of the proposed US 222 freeway between Lancaster and Reading. In July 1977, the final section of the US 222 freeway between Lancaster and the Berks County border opened to traffic.

In 1949, plans were made to build a four-lane bridge across Tulpehocken Creek at Warren Street. As part of this plan, Warren Street was to be widened from the proposed bridge to Schuylkill Avenue. This widened Warren Street was envisioned to become part of a bypass route of Reading for US 222. The bridge and widening were approved with the provision that Warren Street only be widened as far as Schuylkill Avenue as not to build a bypass route through a residential area. Construction on the bridge and the Warren Street Bypass between US 422 (Harrisburg Pike, now Penn Avenue) and PA 83 (now PA 183, Schuylkill Avenue) began in 1950. In 1953, the Park Avenue Extension (which extended Park Avenue in Wyomissing to the bypass) and the Warren Street Bypass from US 422 in Wyomissing to Tulpehocken Creek, along with the Tulpehocken Creek bridge, was finished, with a continuation of the Warren Street Bypass northeast from PA 83 to US 222 (Allentown Pike, now 5th Street Highway) proposed. Construction on the extension of the Warren Street Bypass to US 222 began in 1956 with the process of widening of the existing Warren Street. The PA 83 bridge over the bypass was built in 1957. In 1959, the Warren Street Bypass extension to US 222 was opened to traffic with the portion of Warren Street between Tulpehocken Creek and PA 83 widened to four lanes.  The Warren Street Bypass included an interchange with the under-construction Reading Bypass (now US 422, West Shore Bypass) southwest of Tulpehocken Creek when it opened in 1959. On November 15, 1975, the American Association of State Highway and Transportation Officials (AASHTO) approved for US 222 to be routed to bypass Reading, with the route following US 422 along the West Shore Bypass between Lancaster Avenue and the Warren Street Bypass and the Warren Street Bypass between the West Shore Bypass and Allentown Pike. The former alignment of US 222 through Reading between the West Shore Bypass and the Warren Street Bypass received the US 222 Bus. designation.

In 1984, the Pennsylvania Department of Transportation (PennDOT) was planning to extend PA 145 and US 222 in Allentown. Traffic engineer Samuel D. Darrohh said that Allentown is one of few Pennsylvania cities without a traffic route going through it. After the plan was introduced, he said that motorists might be aided if US 222 were extended along Hamilton Boulevard to connect with the proposed PA 145 corridor. PennDOT originally planned the road as US 222 but AASHTO denied the extension, stating that the route "is not the shortest or best available route between major control points on the system, and therefore, does not adhere to the policies established under AASHTO's 'Purpose and Policy Statement for U.S. Numbered Highways'". In addition, the route did not meet the criteria for a business route. In 1991, it was commissioned as PA 222. PA 145 was extended south of the Lehigh Valley Thruway to the I-78/PA 309 overlap near Lanark.

US 222 in Maryland used to extend down to MD 7 in Perryville. In 1972, the south end of US 222 was cut back to US 40 in Perryville, with MD 222 replacing the route along Aiken Avenue between MD 7 and US 40. AASHTO approved rolling back the southern end of the US 222 designation from US 40 in Perryville to US 1 in Conowingo at their April 1995 spring meeting. The Maryland State Highway Administration proposed and AASHTO approved the redesignation of US 222 to MD 222 from US 40 in Perryville to US 1 in Conowingo in February 1996; however, the new designation had already been enacted officially and marked publicly in 1995.

In 1995, construction began on the Park Road Corridor to connect US 222/US 422 at the junction of the West Shore Bypass and Warren Street Bypass to the Road to Nowhere. Construction of the Park Road Corridor was completed in October 1998. As a result, US 222 was shifted to follow the Park Road Corridor and the Road to Nowhere to bypass the Reading area, replacing SR 3055 along the Road to Nowhere. The former alignment of US 222 that was bypassed became PA 12 along the Warren Street Bypass between US 222/US 422 and US 222 Bus. and a northern extension of US 222 Bus. along 5th Street Highway and Allentown Pike through Muhlenberg Township. In 1998, construction began on the US 222 freeway bypass of Reading between PA 724 and US 422; this section of road opened in 2000. Construction began in 2001 on the US 222 freeway between Grings Hill Road and PA 724 while construction of the section between the Lancaster County border and Grings Hill Road started in 2003. In 2004, construction was completed on the section of the US 222 freeway between Grings Hill Road and PA 724. As a result, US 222 was shifted to follow the new freeway between Grings Hill Road and US 422 and run concurrent with US 422 on the Warren Street Bypass north to the interchange with the West Shore Bypass and PA 12. The former alignment of US 222 along Lancaster Avenue became a southern extension of US 222 Bus. In June 2006, the US 222 freeway was completed between the Lancaster County border and Grings Hill Road; marking the completion of the US 222 freeway between Lancaster and Reading.

In 2002, construction began on a bypass route for US 222 and PA 100 around Trexlertown. On September 29, 2005, PA 100 was rerouted to bypass the community to the west along the four-lane divided Trexlertown Bypass. US 222 was moved onto the bypass on September 28, 2007 following the extension of the bypass east to allow US 222 to bypass the community. The bypass cost $144 million to build. The former alignment of US 222 through Trexlertown along Hamilton Boulevard was designated SR 6222.

In March 2013, construction began on a new bridge to carry US 222/PA 272 over the Amtrak tracks in Lancaster. The bridge project cost $26.6 million, with $12.7 million of that figure the actual construction costs of the bridge. The new bridge, which is four lanes wide and connects Lititz Pike directly with North Duke Street, opened to traffic on July 9, 2014, with the old bridge closed and later demolished. The bridge carrying US 222/PA 272 over the Amtrak line was named the Thaddeus Stevens Bridge in honor of Thaddeus Stevens, a 19th-century abolitionist and United States Representative who was from Lancaster. Concurrent with the construction of the new bridge, McGovern Avenue was converted to a two-way road between North Queen Street and North Duke Street to provide improved access to Lancaster station.

In 2010, officials in Berks County pushed for PennDOT to widen a portion of the two-lane road to four lanes due to traffic and safety issues. In June 2018, plans to widen a portion of US 222 in Maidencreek Township near the PA 73 intersection to five lanes with a center left-turn lane received approval from township supervisors. Bidding for the widening project was expected to begin in spring 2019, with the project lasting for two years. On September 9, 2019, construction began on a $26 million project to widen US 222 at the PA 73 intersection along with adding roundabouts at Genesis Drive and Schaeffer Road in Maidencreek Township. The roundabout at Schaeffer Road opened in December 2021. The construction project widening US 222 in Maidencreek Township and adding two roundabouts was completed in June 2022.

In addition to the proposed widening, a roundabout was planned at the intersection with PA 662 in Richmond Township in order to reduce traffic congestion. The project, which cost $6.6 million, replaced the signalized intersection between the two routes with a roundabout, with US 222 widened to four lanes at the roundabout. Construction of the roundabout began on September 6, 2016. The roundabout opened to traffic on May 22, 2018, with all lanes at the roundabout opened on July 20, 2018. There are plans to construct a roundabout at the intersection with Schantz Road in Upper Macungie Township. In 2021, preliminary design began on a project to widen US 222 between Maidencreek Township and the southern end of the Kutztown Bypass to a four-lane road with a median barrier preventing left turns and cross traffic. Along this stretch, roundabouts will be constructed at Pleasant Hill Road and Richmond Road. Construction contracts are planned to be awarded in 2024 with completion expected in 2026. In 2022, construction will begin on a roundabout at Long Lane in Maxatawny Township. Preliminary engineering to widen US 222 between the northern end of the Kutztown Bypass and the Lehigh County line is not expected to take place until the late 2020s. 

In 2019, construction began to convert the interchange with US 322 near Ephrata into a diverging diamond interchange. The diverging diamond interchange, which cost $10.9 million and received federal funding, opened on May 17, 2021, one year ahead of schedule.

Major intersections

Special routes

Former Maryland truck route

U.S. Route 222 Truck was a  truck bypass of US 222 from US 222 in Perryville to US 1 and US 222 in Conowingo.  The signed route followed MD 275 from US 222 in Perryville north to MD 276 in Woodlawn.  US 222 Truck continued north on MD 276 from Woodlawn north to US 1 west of Rising Sun.  The truck route then headed west on US 1 to US 222 in Conowingo. US 222 Truck was downgraded to MD 222 Truck when US 222 became MD 222 between Perryville and Conowingo.

Reading business loop

U.S. Route 222 Business (US 222 Bus.) is a  business route of US 222 located in Reading, Pennsylvania.  The southern terminus is at US 222 in Cumru Township. Its northern terminus is at US 222 in Ontelaunee Township. The route begins at the US 222 freeway and heads through the southwestern suburbs of Reading as Lancaster Avenue, intersecting PA 724 in Shillington. US 222 Bus. continues into Reading on Lancaster Avenue and intersects the northern termini of PA 625 and PA 10 before reaching an interchange with the US 422 freeway. The business route crosses the Schuylkill River and becomes Bingaman Street. US 222 Bus. turns north on 5th Street and intersects US 422 Bus. in downtown Reading and the southern terminus of PA 61 to the north of downtown. The route interchanges with the PA 12 freeway and continues north through suburban Muhlenberg Township as 5th Street Highway. US 222 Bus. reaches Temple and continues northeast to its northern terminus as Allentown Pike. US 222 Bus. is the only auxiliary route of US 222 in Pennsylvania.

With the creation of the U.S. Highway System in 1926, the road between Reading and Lancaster was designated US 222 while the road between Reading and Allentown was part of US 22, which ran along what was designated the William Penn Highway in 1916 and PA 3 in 1924. In the late 1920s, US 222 briefly ran concurrent with PA 41 and PA 240 at different times.  PA 42 originally ran north–south through Reading starting in 1927. By 1930, the concurrent state route designations were removed from US 222 and US 22. US 222 entered Reading along with PA 73 along Lancaster Avenue and Bingaman Street before turning north on 9th Street along with PA 83 to end at US 22 and US 422 at Penn Street. US 22 continued north on 9th Street out of Reading and continued along Kutztown Road through Temple toward Allentown. US 120 began at US 222 at Bingaman Street and headed north on 4th Street and Center Street out of Reading. In 1931, US 22 was moved to a more direct alignment between Harrisburg and Allentown, and US 222 was extended north along the former alignment between Reading and Allentown. US 222 was shifted to use Lancaster Avenue, Bingaman Street, and 5th Street and 5th Street Highway through the Reading area in the 1930s, running concurrent with US 122 through downtown Reading. The US 122 and PA 73 concurrencies were removed by 1966. In 1975, US 222 was rerouted to bypass Reading on the West Shore Bypass and the Warren Street Bypass, with the former alignment through the city becoming US 222 Bus. In 1998, US 222 Bus. was extended north to its current terminus following the rerouting of US 222 to a new outer bypass of Reading.  The business route was extended south to its current endpoint in 2004 with the completion of the US 222 freeway south of Reading to Mohnton.

See also

References

External links

US 222 at MDRoads.com
Pennsylvania Highways: US 222
US 222 in Maryland at AARoads.com
US 222 in Pennsylvania at AARoads.com
Pennsylvania Roads - US 222
Endpoints of US 222 at USEnds.com

2
22-2
22-2
22-2
Roads in Cecil County, Maryland
Transportation in Lancaster County, Pennsylvania
Transportation in Berks County, Pennsylvania
Transportation in Lehigh County, Pennsylvania